An EMD SD40A is a six-axle diesel-electric locomotive built by General Motors Electro-Motive Division between 1969 and 1970. 18 examples of this locomotive were built exclusively for the Illinois Central Railroad. The SD40A was basically an SD40 built on an SDP45 frame. The longer SDP45 frame allowed for a larger, 5000 gallon fuel tank. This locomotive is powered by a sixteen-cylinder EMD 645E3 diesel engine, which could provide . Illinois Central Railroad used the SD40A as a long-range road-switcher, utilizing the larger fuel tank found on the SDP45. The Soo Line Railroad eventually acquired five of these units and as of 2005 they are out of service. Six other units (IC 6011, and 6013-6018) remain in service under Illinois Central, which is now a subsidiary of Canadian National Railway

References 

 Sarberenyi, Robert. EMD SD40, SD40A, and SDP40 Original Owners. Retrieved on August 27, 2006
 Del Grosso, Robert C.  "Canadian National Railway Historical Review and Motive Power Directory" 2001, Great Northern Pacific Publications.

SD40A
C-C locomotives
Diesel-electric locomotives of the United States
Railway locomotives introduced in 1969
Standard gauge locomotives of the United States
Freight locomotives